Mohammad Beg Talish was a dignitary military commander of Talysh origin, who resided in Khalkhal and served the Safavid order. He married with Shah-Pasha Khatun when her father, Shaykh Junayd (d. 1460), was alive. Shah-Pasha Khatun was the only surviving sister of Shaykh Haydar (1459–1488). This marriage bring an alliance which helped the Safavid dynasty during the last phase of their struggle for power.

He later became guardian (laleh) of Ismail I and played a crucial role in his rise to the throne. Mohammad Beg and his spouse were to play an instrumental role in Ismail's safe passage from Gilan to Ardabil via Talish on the eve of his campaign.

A faction of Talishi followers of the Safavid order, led by Mohammad Beg, made an attempt against Ismail's life on the eve of his travel to eastern Anatolia. According to Qāsim Beg Ḥayātī Tabrīzī (fl. 1554), a poet and bureaucrat of early Safavid era, rumors of Mohammad Beg's involvement in the assassination plot proved unfounded and Ismail spared him, but shortly thereafter, Ismail ordered the execution of Mohammad Beg and appointed his brother-in-law, Hossein Beg Shamlu, as laleh. Hasan Beg Rumlu and other Safavid chroniclers of the 16th-century didn't mention this events.

References

Sources 

 
 
 

15th-century births
1501 deaths
15th-century Iranian military personnel
16th-century Iranian military personnel
People executed by Safavid Iran
Talysh people
16th-century people of Safavid Iran
Safavid military officers